The 1969–70 Honduran Segunda División was the fourth season of the Honduran Segunda División.  Under the management of Alfonso Uclés, C.D. Verdún won the tournament after defeating San Pedro in the final series and obtained promotion to the 1970–71 Honduran Liga Nacional.

Final

 Verdún won 5–2 on aggregate.

References

Segunda
1969